The Qatar national under-16 basketball team represents the country in international under-16 (under age 16) basketball competitions. It is administrated by the Qatar Basketball Federation.

See also 
 Qatar men's national basketball team
 Qatar men's national under-19 basketball team
 Qatar women's national basketball team
 Qatar national 3x3 team

External links
Qatar Basketball Federation
Qatar Basketball Records at FIBA Archive
Asia-basket - Qatari Men National Team U16/17
Presentation on Facebook

References 

National youth sports teams of Qatar
Men's national under-16 basketball teams